Jorge Guillén (born 13 January 1937) is a Spanish basketball player. He competed in the men's tournament at the 1960 Summer Olympics.

References

1937 births
Living people
Spanish men's basketball players
Olympic basketball players of Spain
Basketball players at the 1960 Summer Olympics
Sportspeople from Jerez de la Frontera